Rampur (better known as "Plot" locally or 'Gholvad East'), is the village situated east side of the Railway Station, Gholvad in the Palghar district of Maharashtra, India. It is located in the Dahanu taluka.  Gholvad Gram Panchayat recently got split into two villages to form Rampur as east side of the jurisdiction.

Demographics 

According to the 2011 census of India, Rampur has 1090 households. The literacy rate of the village is 50.84%.

References 

Villages in Dahanu taluka